Acacia pygmaea, commonly known as the dwarf rock wattle, is a shrub of the genus Acacia and the subgenus Phyllodineae that is endemic to south western Australia.

Description
Like most species of Acacia it has phyllodes rather than true leaves. It blooms from October to March and produces white-cream flowers that age to an orange colour.

Taxonomy
It belongs to the Acacia myrtifolia group and is closely related to Acacia disticha and seemingly related to Acacia nervosa and Acacia obovata.

Distribution
It is native to a small area in the Wheatbelt region of Western Australia where it is commonly found in crevices at the summit of ridges growing in laterite based soils. It is usually a part of open Eucalyptus ebbanoensis mallee over open heathland communities composed of Allocasuarina campestris, Banksia pulchella, Banksia hewardiana and Persoonia divergens.

See also
 List of Acacia species

References

pygmaea
Acacias of Western Australia
Taxa named by Bruce Maslin
Plants described in 1995
Endemic flora of Southwest Australia
Avon Wheatbelt